Kiki Sheung Tin-ngoh (born 24 July 1963) is a Hong Kong TVB actress. Kiki was originally with TVB, but moved over to rival station ATV in 1995. She moved back to TVB in 2002.

Awards nominations
 Nominated: Hong Kong Film Award for Best Supporting Actress Sentence to Hang (1990)

Filmography

Television

Film
 The Detective (2007)
 I Love Hong Kong (2011)
 A Secret Between Us (2013)

References

External links
 

1963 births
Living people
Hong Kong film actresses
TVB veteran actors
20th-century Hong Kong actresses
21st-century Hong Kong actresses
Hong Kong television actresses